The Belmont Bruins women's basketball team represents Belmont University in Nashville, Tennessee. They currently play in the Missouri Valley Conference. On April 24, 2017, former DePaul assistant coach Bart Brooks was introduced as the new Bruins' head coach.

History

Belmont began play in 1968, with Division I play beginning in 1997. They have won six conference regular-season titles (two in the ASUN Conference and four in the OVC, with an additional OVC division title) and the conference tournament seven times (ASUN once, OVC six times). They have made the NCAA Tournament seven times, along with eight WNIT appearances and four NAIA Tournament appearances. As of the end of the 2015-16 season, the Bruins have an all-time record of 884-501 and a Division I record of 316-217.

Postseason results

NCAA Division I
The Bruins have made the NCAA Division I women's basketball tournament seven times, and have an overall record of 2–7.

NAIA Division I
The Bruins, then known as the Rebels, made the NAIA Division I women's basketball tournament four times, with a combined record of 6–4.

Notable players
 Alysha Clark (born 1987), American-Israeli basketball player for the Seattle Storm of the Women's National Basketball Association. Completed her college career at Middle Tennessee.

Staff
 Pamela Needs, (Grad Assistant)

References

External links